Salviati may refer to:

Families 
 The Salviati family of Florence
 The Salviati (glassmakers) family, glass makers and mosaicists in 19th-century Venice

People 
 Antonio Salviati (1816–1890), Italian glass manufacturer
 Antonio Maria Salviati (1537–1602), Florentine cardinal
 Bernardo Salviati (1508–1568), Florentine condottiere and cardinal
 Dorothea von Salviati (1907–1972), wife of Prince Wilhelm of Prussia
 Filippo Salviati (1582–1614), Florentine scientist and astronomer
 Filippo Salviati (bishop) (1578–1634), Italian Roman Catholic bishop
 
 Gabriele Salviati (1910–1987), Italian athlete
 Giovanni Salviati (1490–1553), Florentine cardinal
Giuseppe Porta (1520–1575), also known as Giuseppe Salviati, Florentine painter
 Gregorio Salviati (1722–1794), Italian cardinal
 Jacopo Salviati (1461–1533), Florentine nobleman
 Maria Salviati (1499–1543), Florentine noblewoman
 Rino Salviati (1922–2016), Italian singer, guitarist, and film actor

Objects 
 The Salviati Planisphere, an early world map which shows the Spanish view of the Earth drawn in 1525

See also
 Palazzo Salviati (disambiguation)